Mere Sapno Ki Rani (English: Queen of my dreams) is a 1997 Indian Hindi-language film directed by K. Raghavendra Rao and produced by Allu Aravind and C. Ashwini Dutt. It stars Urmila Matondkar, Sanjay Kapoor and Madhoo. The film was a remake of Telugu film Pelli Sandadi.

Cast
 Urmila Matondkar as Sapna
 Sanjay Kapoor as Vijay Kumar 
 Madhoo as Vandana Nehle 
 Kulbhushan Kharbanda as Mr. Kumar
 Satish Kaushik as Ram Nehle
 Anupam Kher as Lakhan Nehle
 Shakti Kapoor as Mamaji
 Laxmikant Berde as Arun
 Dinesh Hingoo as Pandit
 Satyendra Kapoor as Rajnath Nehle 
 Dina Pathak as Rajnath's mom 
 Asrani as Gate-crasher 
 Rakesh Bedi as Gate-crasher

Music

External links

1990s Hindi-language films
1997 films
Indian romantic comedy films
Hindi remakes of Telugu films
Films scored by Anand–Milind
Films directed by K. Raghavendra Rao
1997 romantic comedy films